Hamdan bin Rashid Stadium is a multi-purpose stadium in Hatta, United Arab Emirates. It is currently used mostly for football matches and is the home ground of Hatta Club. The stadium capacity is 5,000.

References

Football venues in the United Arab Emirates
Sports venues in Dubai
Multi-purpose stadiums in the United Arab Emirates